The Prime of My Life is a 1965 studio album by the American singer Billy Eckstine. It was produced by William "Mickey" Stevenson, and was the first of three albums that Eckstine recorded for Motown Records.

Track listing
 "The Prime of My Life" (Jacques, Ron Miller)
 "Maybe Today" (Anderson, Broadnax, Miller, Vandenberg)
 "Who Can I Turn To?" (Leslie Bricusse, Anthony Newley)
 "As Long as She Needs Me" (Lionel Bart)
 "Down to Earth" (Miller, O'Malley, Vandenberg)
 "Feeling Good" (Eger, Yellon)
 "Had You Been Around" (Jaques, Miller, Vandenberg, Yuffy)
 "Love Is Gone" (Hunter, Stevenson)
 "Just Loving You" (Allen, Stevenson)
 "Climb Ev'ry Mountain" (Rodgers, Hammerstein)
 "Fantasy" (Hunter, Stevenson)
 "This Is All I Ask" (Gordon Jenkins)

Personnel 
 Billy Eckstine - vocals
 William "Mickey" Stevenson - producer

References

1965 albums
Albums produced by William "Mickey" Stevenson
Billy Eckstine albums
Motown albums